Explore Learning is a British education company founded in 2001 that provides private learning to complement children’s school education across the UK. 

Explore Learning has over 90 tuition centers across the UK.

Awards and recognition 

 Mumsnet Rated 2022
 UK Business Tech Awards ‘Transformation through technology’ – Winner

References

External links

 Explore Learning for Sale April 2012
Explore Learning website

Education in the United Kingdom
Companies based in Surrey